Cystobacter is a genus in the phylum Myxococcota (Bacteria).

Etymology
The genus name stems from  Greek noun κύστις (kustis), meaning "bladder" and Neolatin masculine noun bacter "rod" consequently the Neolatin masculine noun Cystobacter means bladder-forming rod.

Species
The genus contains 8 species (including basonyms and synonyms), namely
 C. armeniaca Reichenbach 2007 (L. fem. n. armeniaca, an apricot-tree, intended to mean apricot-colored.)
 C. badius Reichenbach 2007 (L. masc. adj. badius, chestnut brown.)
 C. ferrugineus (Krzemieniewska and Krzemieniewski 1927) McCurdy 1970 (L. masc. adj. ferrugineus, of the color of iron-rust, dark-red.)
 C. fuscus Schroeter 1886 (L. masc. adj. fuscus, dark, swarthy, dusky, tawny.)
 C. miniatus Reichenbach 2007 (L. masc. part. adj. miniatus, cinnabar-red.)
 C. velatus Reichenbach 2007 (L. part. adj. velatus, veiled, covered.)

Phylogeny
The currently accepted taxonomy is based on the List of Prokaryotic names with Standing in Nomenclature (LPSN) and National Center for Biotechnology Information (NCBI)

See also
 Bacterial taxonomy
 Microbiology

References

Bacteria genera
Myxococcota